Associazione Sportiva Roma was reinvigorated under new coach Zdeněk Zeman, who recently had been coaching arch rivals Lazio. Zeman brought his attacking 4–3–3 with him, resulting in Roma scoring 67 goals, but also conceding 42, an extreme rarity in defensive-minded Italian football. Roma finished fourth, three places above Lazio in the table. That was the first time it had happened in five years, which delighted the Roma board, and Zeman stayed on for a further season. The season also saw the international breakthrough of former youth-team product Francesco Totti, who at 21 was ready for increased responsibility and captaincy, responding with 13 league goals from a position on the left-wing of the attack. Also noticeable was new signing Cafu's offensive skills as a right-wing back, granting him a reputation among the world's top wing backs.

Players

Transfers

Winter

Competitions

Overall

Last updated: 16 May 1998

Serie A

League table

Results summary

Results by round

Matches

Coppa Italia

Second round

Round of 16

Quarter-finals

Statistics

Players statistics

Goalscorers
  Abel Balbo 14 (3)
  Francesco Totti 13 (1)
  Paulo Sérgio 12
  Marco Delvecchio 7
  Luigi Di Biagio 7 (2)

References

A.S. Roma seasons
Roma